This page lists board and card games, wargames, miniatures games, and tabletop role-playing games published in 1985.  For video games, see 1985 in video gaming.

Games released or invented in 1985

Game awards given in 1985
 Spiel des Jahres: Sherlock Holmes Consulting Detective

See also
 1985 in video gaming

Games
Games by year